The Field Elm cultivar Ulmus minor 'Laciniata' was listed by Wesmael  in Bulletin de la Fédération des sociétés d'horticulture de Belgique 1862: 390 1863 as Ulmus campestris var. nuda subvar. microphylla laciniata Hort. Vilv..

Description
The tree was described as having laciniate leaves 3–5 cm long.

Cultivation
No specimens are known to survive; a specimen at the Ryston Hall , Norfolk, arboretum, obtained from the Léon Chenault nursery in Orléans before 1914, was killed by the earlier strain of Dutch elm disease prevalent in the 1930s.

References

Field elm cultivar
Ulmus articles missing images
Ulmus
Missing elm cultivars